Sumatran pheasant can refer to:
 Hoogerwerf's pheasant
 Salvadori's pheasant